Between the Lines is a game show which was broadcast on Nine Network in Australia. It was a sports-themed comedy show featuring two teams of three players going head-to-head in a quiz. The show was premiered on 12 May 2011 and was hosted by Eddie McGuire with team captains Mick Molloy and Ryan Fitzgerald.

References

Nine Network original programming
2011 Australian television series debuts
2011 Australian television series endings
2010s Australian game shows
English-language television shows